The hairy slit-faced bat (Nycteris hispida) is a species of slit-faced bat widely distributed throughout forests and savannas in Africa. Two recognized subspecies exist: N. h. hispida and N. h. pallida. Various forest populations in western and central Africa may represent separate species, although this had not been confirmed as of 2007.

References

Bats of Africa
Nycteridae
Mammals described in 1775
Taxa named by Johann Christian Daniel von Schreber